Ron Meredith (born 26 May 1932) is a South African water polo player. He competed at the 1952 Summer Olympics and the 1960 Summer Olympics.

References

1932 births
Living people
South African male water polo players
Olympic water polo players of South Africa
Water polo players at the 1952 Summer Olympics
Water polo players at the 1960 Summer Olympics
Sportspeople from Johannesburg